Praxedis (minor planet designation: 547 Praxedis), provisional designation , is a Postremian asteroid from the central regions of the asteroid belt, approximately 52 kilometers in diameter.

Description 

The asteroid was discovered on 14 October 1904, by astronomer Paul Götz at the Heidelberg-Königstuhl State Observatory in southwest Germany. It was named from literature after the character "Praxedis" in Joseph Victor von Scheffel's historical romance Ekkehard (1857). The official naming citation was mentioned in The Names of the Minor Planets by Paul Herget in 1955.

Praxedis is a member of the Postrema family, a mid-sized central asteroid family of little more than 100 members. It orbits the Sun in the central main-belt at a distance of 2.1–3.4 AU once every 4 years and 8 months (1,690 days). Its orbit has an eccentricity of 0.24 and an inclination of 17° with respect to the ecliptic.

In the Tholen classification, Praxedis has an ambiguous spectral type, closest to an X-type and somewhat similar to that of a darker D-type asteroid. In the SMASS classification it is a Xk-subtype that transitions from the X- to the rare K-type asteroids. According to the survey carried out by NASA's Wide-field Infrared Survey Explorer, Praxedis measures 52.462 kilometers in diameter and its surface has an albedo of 0.101.

References

External links 
 Asteroid Lightcurve Database (LCDB), query form (info )
 Dictionary of Minor Planet Names, Google books
 Discovery Circumstances: Numbered Minor Planets (1)-(5000) – Minor Planet Center
 
 

000547
Discoveries by Paul Götz
Named minor planets
000547
000547
19041014